Hubbard Township may refer to:

Hubbard Township, Hubbard County, Minnesota
Hubbard Township, Polk County, Minnesota

See also
Hubbard Township (disambiguation)

Minnesota township disambiguation pages